The Széchenyi Chain Bridge is a chain bridge that spans the River Danube between Buda and Pest, the western and eastern sides of Budapest, the capital of Hungary. Designed by English engineer William Tierney Clark and built by Scottish engineer Adam Clark, it was the first permanent bridge across the Danube in Hungary. It was opened in 1849. It is anchored on the Pest side of the river to Széchenyi (formerly Roosevelt) Square, adjacent to the Gresham Palace and the Hungarian Academy of Sciences, and on the Buda side to Adam Clark Square, near the Zero Kilometre Stone and the lower end of the Castle Hill Funicular, leading to Buda Castle.

The bridge has the name of István Széchenyi, a major supporter of its construction, attached to it, but is most commonly known as the "Chain Bridge". At the time of its construction, it was regarded as one of the modern world's engineering wonders. Its decorations are made of cast iron.

History 

The bridge was designed by English engineer William Tierney Clark in 1839, following an initiative by Count István Széchenyi, with construction supervised locally by Scottish engineer Adam Clark (no relation). It is a larger-scale version of Tierney Clark's earlier Marlow Bridge, across the River Thames in Marlow, England, and was designed in sections and shipped from the United Kingdom to Hungary for final construction.

It was funded to a considerable extent by the Greek merchant Georgios Sinas who had financial and land interests in the city and whose name is inscribed on the base of the south-western foundation of the bridge on the Buda side.

The bridge opened in 1849, after the Hungarian Revolution of 1848, becoming the first permanent bridge in the Hungarian capital. The lions at each of the abutments were carved in stone by the sculptor  and installed in 1852. They are similar in design to the bronze lions of Trafalgar Square (commissioned in 1858 and installed in 1867). The bridge was given its current name in 1898.

The bridge's cast-iron structure was updated and strengthened in 1914. In World War II, the bridge was blown up on 18 January 1945 by the retreating Germans during the Siege of Budapest, with only the towers remaining. It was rebuilt, and reopened in 1949.

The inscription on each side of the bridge is to "Clark Adam", the bridge builder's name in the local Eastern name order. A plaque on the Pest side of the river reads "To commemorate the only two surviving bridges designed by William Tierney Clark: The Széchenyi Chain Bridge over the Danube at Budapest and the suspension bridge over the Thames at Marlow, England."

The bridge has been closed for traffic since March 2021 for renovations;  it is expected to reopen in 2023.

In popular culture
In 2001 Hungarian stunt pilot Péter Besenyei flew upside down under the bridge, a manoeuvre that became a standard in Red Bull air races today.

The bridge is featured in I Spy, Au Pair, Walking with the Enemy and Spy, and is the setting of the climax scene in Bollywood blockbuster Hum Dil De Chuke Sanam. The bridge appears in the opening shots of the 2021 Black Widow trailer, and season two of Baptiste.

The bridge featured prominently in Matthew Barney's Cremaster 5, serving as a reference to Harry Houdini, and also appears in Dan Brown's novel Origin and in the Season Two premiere episode of Syfy channel's 12 Monkeys, which aired in April 2016.

It also appears at the beginning of the video for Katy Perry's song "Firework", and K-pop vocal duo Davichi's music video for the song "Cry Again".

According to a Hungarian legend, the lions of Széchenyi Chain Bridge have no tongues. This legend is not true, the tongues are just not visible.

See also
Bridges of Budapest
List of crossings of the Danube

References

External links 

 
 Hungarian Electronic Libraries' entry on Hungarian bridges
 Bridges of Budapest - Chain Bridge
 Buda Pesth Chain Bridge Archive Recording

Belváros-Lipótváros
Bridges in Budapest
Bridges completed in 1849
Bridges over the Danube
Chain bridges
Suspension bridges in Hungary
Széchenyi family
Landmarks in Hungary
Industrial archaeological sites in Hungary
1849 establishments in the Austrian Empire
19th-century architecture in Austria